Yde (Adelaide) Schloenbach, later Blumenschein by marriage, (26 May 1882 in São Paulo – 14 March 1963 in São Paulo) was a Brazilian poet and chronicler best known as Colombina. She also used the pen name Paula Brasil.

She started writing at the age of 13, and her first poems were published in A Tribuna, a newspaper in the city of Santos. She wrote for magazines and newspapers such as O Malho, Fon-Fon, Careta and Jornal das Moças.

In 1948, she founded the "Casa do Poeta Lampião de Gás", a literary society that initially met in her own home. This society published a monthly newspaper, "O Fanal", of which she was the publisher.

Her poetry is centered on the theme of love, usually treated in a quite innocent way, though some of her poems have a more erotic vein that caused some scandal at her time. Her last book, Rapsódia Rubra - Poemas à Carne ("Red Rapsody - Poems Dedicated to Flesh"), reflects this trend, and its highly erotic poetry was particularly polemical at the time of its publishing.

Published books 
Vislumbres (Sightings), 1908.
Versos em lá menor (Verses in A minor), 1930.
Lampião de gás (Gas Lamp), 1937.
Sândalo (Sandalwood), 1941;
Uma cigarra cantou para você (A Cicada Sang for You), 1946.
Distância: poemas de amor e de renúncia (Distance: Poems of Love and Renounce), 1947
Gratidão (Thankfulness), 1954.
Para você, meu amor (To You, my Love), 1955.
Cantares de bem-querer (Songs of Love), 1956.
Manto de arlequim (Harlequin's Gown), 1956.
Inverno em flor (Winter in Bloom), 1959.
Cantigas de luar (Moonshine Songs), 1960.
Rapsódia rubra - Poemas à Carne (Red Rapsody - Poems Dedicated to Flesh), 1961

References

External links

1882 births
1963 deaths
Brazilian people of German descent
Brazilian women poets
Writers from São Paulo
20th-century Brazilian poets
20th-century Brazilian women writers